Ann Kirk was an American film actress who had a small career in the 1910s during the silent film era.

Filmography
Tides That Meet (1915, Short) as Estelle Daley
The Quitter (1915, Short) as Byrd Remington
The Market Price of Love (1915, Short) as Mrs. Julia Rodney
When My Lady Smiles (1915, Short) as Velda Browning 
A Traitor to Art (1916, Short) as Brenda Adams
A Rose of Italy (1916, Short) as Lucia Lamberti
Folly (1916, Short) as Morse's Adopted Daughter

References

External links

1894 births
Year of death unknown
20th-century deaths
American silent film actresses
20th-century American actresses